Gavin Phillip Salam,  is a theoretical particle physicist and a senior research fellow at All Souls College as well as a senior member of staff at CERN in Geneva. His research investigates the strong interaction of Quantum Chromodynamics (QCD), the theory of quarks and gluons.

Education
Salam was educated at the Lycée Français Charles de Gaulle in London and the University of Cambridge where he was awarded a Bachelor of Arts degree in 1993 followed by a PhD in particle physics in 1996. During his postgraduate study he was based in the Cavendish Laboratory where his research investigated the scattering of Quarkonium funded by the Particle Physics and Astronomy Research Council (PPARC).

Research and career
Salam's research explores the ways in which QCD can be exploited to understand elementary particle interactions, notably the Higgs boson, and also how it can be harnessed in the search for new particles. He has made significant contributions to the understanding of the structure of the proton and of jets (cones of hadrons), the signatures of quarks and gluons produced in high-energy collisions. He invented the most widely used approach for identifying jets at the Large Hadron Collider.

Before working at CERN, Salam held appointments at Princeton University in the United States and the Istituto Nazionale di Fisica Nucleare (INFN) in Milan. He joined the Centre national de la recherche scientifique (CNRS) in 2000, in the Laboratoire de Physique Théorique et Hautes Energies (LPTHE) attached to the Pierre and Marie Curie University in Paris.

Salam appeared with Jon Butterworth in the Science and Technology Facilities Council (STFC) documentary Colliding Particles – Hunting the Higgs, which follows a team of physicists trying to find the Higgs Boson.

Awards and honours
Salam was elected a Fellow of the Royal Society (FRS) in 2017 and awarded the Médaille d'argent (Silver Medal) of the CNRS in 2010.

References

Fellows of the Royal Society
People associated with CERN
People educated at Lycée Français Charles de Gaulle
Theoretical physicists
Particle physicists
Living people
Year of birth missing (living people)